Paul Lüönd (15 April 1950 – 3 April 2014) was a Swiss musician and politician. He formed a group with his older two brothers called Mosibuäbe. He grew up in the Mosi in Ingenbohl and was a member of the right-wing populist Swiss People's Party.

He died on 3 April 2014 from a long illness in Switzerland, aged 63.

References

Other websites

1950 births
2014 deaths
20th-century Swiss musicians
Swiss politicians
21st-century Swiss musicians